The Scunthorpe problem is the unintentional blocking of websites, e-mails, forum posts or search results by a spam filter or search engine because their text contains a string (or substring) of letters that appear to have an obscene or otherwise unacceptable meaning. Names, abbreviations, and technical terms are most often cited as being affected by the issue.

The problem arises since computers can easily identify strings of text within a document, but interpreting words of this kind requires considerable ability to interpret a wide range of contexts, possibly across many cultures, which is an extremely difficult task. As a result, broad blocking rules may result in false positives affecting innocent phrases.

Etymology and origin 
The problem was named after an incident in 1996 in which AOL's profanity filter prevented residents of the town of Scunthorpe, North Lincolnshire, England, from creating accounts with AOL, because the town's name contains the substring "cunt". In the early 2000s, Google's opt-in SafeSearch filters made the same error, preventing people from searching for local businesses or URLs that included Scunthorpe in their names.

Workarounds 
The Scunthorpe problem is challenging to completely solve due to the difficulty of creating a filter capable of understanding words in context.

One solution involves creating a white list of known false positives. Any word appearing on the white list can be ignored by the filter, even though it contains text that would otherwise not be allowed.

Other examples 
Mistaken decisions by obscenity filters include:

Refused web domain names and account registrations 
 In April 1998, Jeff Gold attempted to register the domain name shitakemushrooms.com, but due to the substring shit he was blocked by an InterNIC filter prohibiting the "seven dirty words". (Shiitake, also commonly spelled shitake, is the Japanese name for the edible fungus Lentinula edodes.)
 In 2000, a Canadian television news story on web filtering software found that the website for the Montreal Urban Community (Communauté Urbaine de Montréal, in French) was entirely blocked because its domain name was its French acronym CUM (www.cum.qc.ca); "cum" (among other meanings) is English-language slang for semen.
 In February 2004 in Scotland, Craig Cockburn reported that he was unable to use his surname (pronounced "Coburn") with Hotmail because it contains the substring cock, a vulgar slang word for the penis. Separately he had problems with his workplace email because his job title, software specialist, contained the substring Cialis, an erectile dysfunction medication commonly mentioned in spam e-mails. Hotmail initially told him to spell his name C0ckburn (with a zero instead of the letter "o") but later reversed the ban. In 2010, he had a similar problem registering on the BBC website, where again the first four characters of his surname caused a problem for the content filter.
 In February 2006, Linda Callahan was initially prevented from registering her name with Yahoo! as an e-mail address as it contained the substring Allah. Yahoo! later reversed the ban.
 In July 2008, Dr. Herman I. Libshitz could not register an e-mail address containing his name with Verizon because his surname contained the substring shit, and Verizon initially rejected his request for an exception. In a subsequent statement, a Verizon spokeswoman apologized for not approving his desired e-mail address.

Blocked web searches 
 In the months leading up to January 1996, some web searches for Super Bowl XXX were being filtered, because the Roman numeral for the game and the site (XXX) is also used to identify pornography.
 Gareth Roelofse, the web designer for RomansInSussex.co.uk, noted in 2004: "We found many library Net stations, school networks and Internet cafes block sites with the word 'sex' in the domain name. This was a challenge for RomansInSussex.co.uk because its target audience is school children."
The town subsequently put the town name on the filter's whitelist.
 In July 2011, web searches in China on the name Jiang were blocked following claims on the Sina Weibo microblogging site that former Chinese Communist Party (CCP) general secretary Jiang Zemin had died. Since the word "Jiang" meaning "river" is written with the same Chinese character (江), searches related to rivers including the Yangtze (Cháng Jiāng) produced the message: "According to the relevant laws, regulations and policies, the results of this search cannot be displayed."
 In February 2018, web searches on Google's shopping platform were blocked for items such as glue guns, Guns N' Roses, and Burgundy wine after Google hastily patched its search system that was displaying results for weapons and accessories that violated Google's stated policies.

Blocked emails 
In 2001, Yahoo! Mail introduced an email filter which automatically replaced JavaScript-related strings with alternative versions, to prevent the possibility of cross-site scripting in HTML email. The filter would hyphenate the terms "JavaScript", "JScript", "VBScript" and "LiveScript"; and replaced "eval", "mocha"  and "expression" with the similar but not quite synonymous terms "review", "espresso" and "statement", respectively. Assumptions were involved in the writing of the filters: no attempts were made to limit these string replacements to anchor script sections and attributes, or to respect word boundaries, in case this would leave some loopholes open. This resulted in such errors as medireview in place of medieval.
 In February 2003, Members of Parliament at the British House of Commons found that a new spam filter was blocking emails containing references to the Sexual Offences Bill then under debate, as well as some messages relating to a Liberal Democrat consultation paper on censorship. It also blocked emails sent in Welsh because it did not recognise the language.
 In October 2004, it was reported that the Horniman Museum in London was failing to receive some of its email because filters mistakenly treated its name as a version of the words horny man.

Blocked for words with multiple meanings 
 In October 2004, e-mails advertising the pantomime Dick Whittington sent to schools by Helen McDermott from Norwich in the UK were blocked by school computers because of the use of the name Dick, sometimes used as slang for penis.
 In May 2006, a man in Manchester in the UK found that e-mails he wrote to his local council to complain about a planning application had been blocked as they contained the word erection when referring to a structure.
 Blocked e-mails and web searches relating to The Beaver, a magazine based in Winnipeg, caused the publisher to change its name to Canada's History in 2010, after 89 years of publication. Publisher Deborah Morrison commented: "Back in 1920, The Beaver was a perfectly appropriate name. And while its other meaning [vulva] is nothing new, its ambiguity began to pose a whole new challenge with the advance of the Internet. The name became an impediment to our growth".
 In June 2010, Twitter blocked a user from Luxembourg 29 minutes after he had opened his account and posted his first tweet. The tweet read: "Finally! A pair of great tits (Parus major) has moved into my birdhouse!" Despite including the Latin name to point out that the tweet was about birds, any attempts to unblock the account were in vain.
 In 2011, a councillor in Dudley found an email flagged for profanity by his council's security software after mentioning the Black Country dish faggots (a type of meatball, but also a pejorative term for gay men).
 Residents of Penistone in South Yorkshire have had e-mails blocked because the town's name includes the substring penis.
 Residents of Clitheroe (Lancashire, England) have been repeatedly inconvenienced because their town's name includes the substring clit, which is short for "clitoris".
 Résumés containing references to graduating with Latin honors such as cum laude,  magna cum laude, and  summa cum laude have been blocked by spam filters because of inclusion of the word cum, which is Latin for with (in this usage), but is sometimes used as slang for semen or ejaculation in English usage.

News articles 
 In June 2008, a news site run by the anti-LGBT lobby group American Family Association filtered an Associated Press article on sprinter Tyson Gay, replacing instances of "gay" with "homosexual", thus rendering his name as "Tyson Homosexual". This same function had previously changed the name of basketball player Rudy Gay to "Rudy Homosexual".
 The word or string "ass" may be replaced by "butt", resulting in "clbuttic" for "classic", "buttignment" for "assignment", and "buttbuttinate" for "assassinate".

Other 
 In 2008, Microsoft confirmed that its policy to prevent the use of words relating to sexual orientation had meant that Richard Gaywood's name was deemed offensive and could not be used in his "gamertag" or in the "Real Name" field of his bio.
 In 2011, in the video games Pokémon Black and White, the Pokémon Cofagrigus could not be traded online to other players without a nickname because its species name contained the substring fag. The system has since been updated to allow players to trade it without nicknames. The same problem occurred with Nosepass, Probopass and Froslass due to their inclusion of the substring ass.
 In 2013, file transfers named for the Swedish city of Falun caused web connection outages at Diakrit, a firm based in China. Diakrit resolved the issue by renaming the files. Fredrik Bergman of Diakrit believes that the file names triggered the Great Firewall's censors used to block discussion of Falun Gong, a banned religious movement founded in China.
 In November 2013, Facebook temporarily blocked British users for using the word faggot in reference to the traditional dish of the same name.
 In January 2014, files used in the online game League of Legends were reportedly blocked by some UK ISP filters due to the names 'VarusExpirationTimer.luaobj' and 'XerathMageChainsExtended.luaobj', which contain the substring sex. This was later corrected.
 In May 2018, the website of the grocery store Publix would not allow a cake to be ordered containing the Latin phrase summa cum laude. The customer attempted to rectify the problem by including special instructions but still ended up with a cake reading "Summa --- Laude".
 In May 2020, despite extensive media scrutiny, some hashtags directly referring to British political advisor Dominic Cummings were unable to trend on Twitter because the substring cum triggered an anti-porn filter.
 In October 2020, a Twitter profanity filter banned the words "bone", "pubic", and "stream" at a paleontology conference.
 In January 2021, Facebook apologized for muting and banning users after it had erroneously flagged the Devon landmark Plymouth Hoe as misogynistic.
 In April 2021, the official Facebook page for the French Commune of Bitche was taken down. In response, commune officials created a new page referencing instead the postal code, Mairie 57230. Facebook later apologized and restored the original page. As a precaution, the officials of Rohrbach-lès-Bitche renamed their Facebook page Ville de Rohrbach.

See also 
 Censorship by Google
 Cupertino effect
 False positive
 Predictive text
 Rebracketing
 Spam detection
 Wordfilter

References 

AOL
Internet censorship
Profanity
Scunthorpe
Software bugs
Spam filtering
1996 introductions